Limburg-Styrum-Styrum was a County of medieval Germany, based in the Lordship of Styrum in modern North Rhine-Westphalia. Limburg-Styrum-Styrum was a partition of Limburg-Styrum in 1644. When the line of Limburg-Styrum-Iller-Aichheim became extinct in 1800, Limburg-Styrum-Styrum failed to inherit it and the Imperial Estate of Gemen, which instead passed to the Barons of Boyneburg-Bömelberg. In 1806 Limburg-Styrum-Styrum was mediatised to the Grand Duchy of Berg. The line itself became extinct in 1809.

Counts of Limburg-Styrum-Styrum (1644–1806)

House of Limburg
Counties of the Holy Roman Empire
House of Limburg-Stirum
States and territories disestablished in 1806
1806 disestablishments
1644 establishments in the Holy Roman Empire